Tomorrow People or variant may refer to:
 The Tomorrow People, a British science fiction franchise, with a 1970s TV show, 1990s TV show, 2000s CD audio series
 The Tomorrow People (U.S. TV series), 2013 American remake of the British franchise
 The Tomorrow People (novel), a 1960 science fiction novel by Judith Merril
 Tomorrow People (band), a seven-member New Zealand reggae band formed in 2010
 Tomorrow People (song), a 1988 song by Ziggy Marley from the album Conscious Party
 Tomorrow People, a 1993 song by Billy Idol from the album Cyberpunk
 Tomorrow's People, a 2001 song by 21st Century Schizoid Band from the album Live in Japan
 Tomorrow's People – The Children of Today, a track from the 1971 album McDonald and Giles
 The Tomorrow People, a 1963 melody by Raymond Scott featured on the album Manhattan Research Inc.
 People of Tomorrow, a 2001 song by Eiffel 65 from the album Contact!
 The Tomorrow People (Ultimate X-Men), a story arc in the Ultimate X-Men comics